Cobbett is a surname. Notable people with the surname include:

 Hilary Dulcie Cobbett (1885–1976), British artist
 William Cobbett (1763–1835), British radical agriculturist and prolific journalist.
 Walter Willson Cobbett (1847–1937), British author of Cobbett's Cyclopedic Survey of Chamber Music.